Mulo is a woreda of Oromia Special Zone Surrounding Finfinne in Oromia Region, Ethiopia. It was part of the former Mulona Sululta woreda.

Demographics 
The 2007 national census reported a total population for this woreda of 35,138, of whom 17,708 were men and 17,430 were women; 2,296 or 6.53% of its population were urban dwellers. The majority of the inhabitants said they practised Ethiopian Orthodox Christianity, with 99.27% of the population reporting they practised that belief.

References 

Districts of Oromia Region